PSR J0738−4042 is the first pulsar observed to have been affected by asteroids.

It was originally discovered in 1968. In 2013 scientists at the University of Oxford, Hartebeesthoek Observatory and CSIRO announced that they had observed changes in the pulsar's spin rate and the shape of its radio pulse indicating that asteroids were encountering it, including one with a mass of about a billion tons.

The scientists suggested that the material blown out from the explosion which formed the pulsar could have fallen back towards it, developing a disk of debris including asteroids.

References

Puppis
Pulsars